The Nerother Kopf is the conical hill of an extinct volcano (a cinder cone) near Neroth in the Eifel mountains.

Geographical location 
The Nerother Kopf rises in the Volcanic Eifel Nature Park on the eastern edge of the Gerolstein Land. Its north top, or kuppe, lies around 1 km east-southeast of Neroth, 2.5 km west-southwest of Neunkirchen, 3.5 km west of Pützborn and 2 km (all as the crow flies) north of Oberstadtfeld. About 450 metres from the north top is the lower south kuppe. To the west the stream of Kleine Kyll flows through Neroth.

Description and history 
On the north top of the originally prominent double volcano are the ruins of a castle, the Freudenkoppe - built 1337–1340 and now a protected monument - as well as the Mühlstein Cave. The entrance to the cave, which is near the summit, lies at a height of 643.2 m. It was in the cave where the Nerother Wandervogel, a youth club, was founded on New Year's Eve in 1919/1920. The nature reserve of Nerother Kopf around the beech-covered north top is a popular walking and recreation area which is accessed by several paths including the Eifelsteig, which runs right over the summit. The south top, whose summit region is treeless, has been mined for many years for its basalt. The snow-covered edge of the quarry can be seen in the above photograph on the horizon to the right of the summit.

See also 
 List of mountains and hills of the Eifel
 List of volcanoes in Germany

References

External links 
 Nerother Kopf, at neroth.de

Mountains under 1000 metres
Cinder cones
Natural monuments in Rhineland-Palatinate
Mountains and hills of the Eifel
Mountains and hills of Rhineland-Palatinate
Nature reserves in Rhineland-Palatinate
Vulkaneifel